Belton Johnson (born July 23, 1980) is a former Canadian football offensive tackle. He was signed by the Cincinnati Bengals as an undrafted free agent in 2003. He played college football at Mississippi.

Johnson was a member of the BC Lions, Winnipeg Blue Bombers, Saskatchewan Roughriders, Hamilton Tiger-Cats and Edmonton Eskimos. He is the older brother of NFL offensive lineman Marcus Johnson.

External links
Just Sports Stats
Hamilton Tiger-Cats bio

1980 births
Living people
American football offensive tackles
American players of Canadian football
Canadian football offensive linemen
Hamilton Tiger-Cats players
Cincinnati Bengals players
Edmonton Elks players
Ole Miss Rebels football players
People from Coffeeville, Mississippi
Saskatchewan Roughriders players
Winnipeg Blue Bombers players